Eva Shaw is a Canadian DJ, songwriter, record producer, and fashion model. Growing up, she was involved in acting, music and the arts. Shaw taught herself how to DJ and make beats as a hobby, ended up moving to New York City to pursue her dream of acting. Shaw's first single release "Charizma" was signed by Calvin Harris to his own label Fly Eye Records. She gained recognition from her follow up songs "Get Down" that reached No. 39 on the Billboard Hot Dance/Electronic Songs chart, "Space Jungle" which received over 40 million views, "Moxie" which was released on Afrojack's label in 2015, and "N2U" with singer Martha Wash. She had DJ residencies at Las Vegas nightclubs including Hakkasan in MGM Grand.

Discography

EPs

Charting singles

Singles

References

Notes 

 A  Did not enter the Ultratop 50, but peaked at number 17 on the Flemish Dance Bubbling Under chart. and No. 7 on the Wallonia Dance Bubbling Under chart.

Sources

External links 
 
 
 
 

Year of birth missing (living people)
Living people
Women DJs
Canadian women in electronic music
Female models from Ontario
21st-century Canadian women musicians
Canadian people of Dutch descent
Electronic dance music DJs